James Henry Caldwell (1793–1863), was an English-born American actor, theatre manager and entrepreneur. Known as New Orleans "Father of Light", he owned the New Orleans Gas Light Company, making New Orleans the fourth city in the United States to have gas lighting. Also a theater entrepreneur, he built the first English speaking theater in New Orleans and many theaters across the South.

Biography

Theater activities
He introduced English language theatre in New Orleans, where he managed the  St. Philip Street Theatre in 1820–22, the Camp Street Theatre in 1822–1835, and the St. Charles Theatre in 1835–1842.

After Charleston, South Carolina, in 1817, he moved to Virginia, setting up a theatrical circuit in many areas including Richmond and Petersburg. He later moved to New Orleans in 1820, where he leased St. Philip Street Theatre and built his own acting company.

As well as managing the Camp Street Theatre for 11 years, Caldwell took his company to various towns including Natchez, Nashville, Huntsville. In 1829, Sol Smith, a famous actor and manager in the Southwest at the time, joined his company. There were also many other famous actors that Caldwell engaged with; Edwin Forrest was one of them who performed at the Camp Street Theatre in 1829.

Soon after, he announced his retirement, leasing the Camp Street Theatre to Richard Russell and James Simon Rowe, but never fully retired due to his love for the theatre and his career. He instead opened St. Charles Theatre in 1835 and the Royal Street Theatre in 1841. However, Caldwell fully retired when the St. Charles Theatre burned down in 1842.

Business career
Caldwell introduced gas lighting to New Orleans.
He organized the New Orleans Gas Light Company, with a capital of $300,000. Failing to get any of the citizens to join him in this pioneer, but promising, enterprise, he determined to light the city at his own expense, which remarkable feat he accomplished in September 1833.

But it wasn't until he left the stage and moved from New Orleans to Louisville that he amassed his immense wealth. He established gas companies in New Orleans and other cities, including Cincinnati, St. Louis and Mobile, and also prospered from real estate ventures in Louisville.

Through his son William Shakespeare Caldwell (1821–1874), he was the grandfather of American philanthropist Mary Gwendolin des Monstiers-Mérinville and the great-grandfather of German-born American bridge champion Waldemar von Zedtwitz.

References

1863 deaths
19th-century American male actors
American male stage actors
1793 births
19th-century American businesspeople
19th-century theatre managers